The Camp Breckinridge Non-Commissioned Officers' Club, at 1116 N. Village Rd. in Morganfield, Kentucky, was built in 1942 for the U.S. Army by contractor Struck Construction.  It was listed on the National Register of Historic Places in 2001.

The officers' club was a site of murals painted by World War II German prisoners of war.

The facility was later the James D. Veatch Camp Breckinridge Museum and Arts Center.

The listing included a contributing building, a contributing structure, a contributing object, and a contributing site.

References

National Register of Historic Places in Union County, Kentucky
Government buildings completed in 1942
1942 establishments in Kentucky
Clubhouses on the National Register of Historic Places in Kentucky
Military facilities on the National Register of Historic Places in Kentucky
Military officers' clubs